Bar Aftab-e Sardasht (also Romanized as Bar Āftāb-e Sardasht) is a village in Sardasht Rural District, in the Central District of Lordegan County, Chaharmahal and Bakhtiari Province, Iran. At the 2006 census, its population was 1,371, in 242 families.

References 

Populated places in Lordegan County